Pamana is a Filipino educational television series developed by the Sky Foundation (now the Knowledge Channel Foundation) and broadcast on Knowledge Channel beginning in 2001. Both this series and Kasaysayan TV were the first original programs to be created by the foundation.

Pamana was developed to engage elementary school students in Philippine geography and culture.

Cast
Julia Clarete and Jan Marini Alano as Ms. Cruz
Julia Clarete and Angel Aquino as Diway
Jet Paz as Niko
Jiro Manio and Julio Pacheco as Nico
Deo Noveno and Ricky Antenor as Bobby Buot

Guest appearances
Hans Dimayuga as Billy
Cris Jones as a farmer
Steve Zamboa as Mang Dan
Linda Gonzales as Ms. Santos
Justine Moreno as Emilio Aguinaldo
Teddy Garcia as a Filipino soldier
Al Sison as Julian Felipe
Jeric Bautista as Manuel Quezon
Michelle Bautista as a moviegoer
Froilan Sales as a father
Girlie Alcantara as a mother
Claudine Alejandro as Ate Arlene
Timothy Gaspar as Kuya Mark
Keno Agaro as Kuya Jesse
Jelly Cruz as Ika

Production
Maria Bernadette L. Abrera, then an associate professor of history at the University of the Philippines, was a consultant for Pamana.

See also
Knowledge Channel

References

2001 Philippine television series debuts
Cultural depictions of Emilio Aguinaldo
Filipino-language television shows
Philippine educational television series